The Heiligenstadt Testament is a letter written by Ludwig van Beethoven to his brothers Carl and Johann at Heiligenstadt on 6 October 1802.

It reflects his despair over his increasing deafness, even his contemplation of suicide, and his continued desire to overcome his physical and emotional ailments to complete his artistic destiny. Beethoven kept the document among his private papers and probably never showed it to anyone. It was discovered in March 1827, after Beethoven's death, by Anton Schindler and Stephan von Breuning, who had it published the following October.

While Carl's name appears in the appropriate places, blank spaces are left where Johann's name should appear (as in the upper right corner of the accompanying image). There have been several suggestions for this, ranging from Beethoven's uncertainty as to whether Johann's full name (Nikolaus Johann) should be used on this quasi-legal document, to his mixed feelings of attachment to his brothers, to transference of his lifelong hatred of the boys' alcoholic, abusive, deceased father, also named Johann.

Since 1888, the original document has been in the State and University Library Carl von Ossietzky at the University of Hamburg, a gift from the Swedish singer Jenny Lind and her husband, Otto Goldschmidt.

References

Further reading

External links

Ludwig van Beethoven
Wills and testaments by person
Letters (message)
1802 documents